WRZQ-FM (107.3 MHz) is a commercial FM radio station licensed to Greensburg, Indiana, and serving Columbus, Franklin and Seymour, Indiana.  It broadcasts a hot adult contemporary radio format and is owned by Reising Radio Partners Inc.  It calls itself "Q Mix."

WRZQ-FM has an effective radiated power (ERP) of 10,500 watts.  The transmitter is on North 850 East in Newbern, Indiana.

History
The station signed on as WTRE-FM in December 1962.  It was owned by the Clear Tone Broadcasting Company. Clear Tone added an AM station, WTRE 1330 kHz, in 1966.  The two stations simulcast their programming for the next decade and a half.  

In 1983, WTRE-FM made some changes.  It became WRZQ-FM and moved its transmitter closer to Columbus.  WRZQ-FM offered a satellite-delivered adult contemporary format.

References

External links
WRZQ's official website

RZQ
Radio stations established in 1962
1962 establishments in Indiana